Hz is the International Standard symbol for hertz, a unit of frequency.

HZ may also stand for:
 HZ (character encoding)
 Habitable zone, the distance from a star where a planet can maintain Earth-like life
 Hazard, a situation that poses a level of threat
 Haze, in meteorology, METAR code HZ
 Herero language (ISO 639 alpha-2)
 Herpes zoster, the shingles virus
 Holden HZ, an automobile produced by General Motors Holden in the late 1970s
 Hz-program, a typographic composition computer program created by Hermann Zapf.
 HZ University of Applied Sciences, a vocational university in Zeeland, Netherlands
 SAT Airlines (IATA airline designator)
 Saudi Arabia (aircraft registration code)
 Croatian Railways (Hrvatske željeznice, HŽ)